Malanshof is a suburb of Johannesburg, South Africa. An old Randburg municipal suburb, it is tucked between the suburbs of Fontainebleau and Strijdompark. It is located in Region B of the City of Johannesburg Metropolitan Municipality.

History
The suburb was surveyed in 1961 and was originally named Raeburn before it changed and was named after South African prime minister D.F. Malan.

References

Johannesburg Region B